Soner Sucu (born September 3, 1986, in Amasya) is an amateur Turkish Greco-Roman wrestler, who competes in the men's lightweight category. He won a bronze medal in his division at the 2009 Mediterranean Games in Pescara, Italy. Sucu is a member of the wrestling team for Bueyuek Sehir Belediyesi, and is coached and trained by Hakki Basar.

Sucu represented Turkey at the 2008 Summer Olympics in Beijing, where he competed in the men's 60 kg class. He received a bye for the second preliminary round match, before losing out to Russia's Islambek Albiev, who was able to score six points each in two straight periods, leaving Sucu without a single point. Because his opponent advanced further into the final match, Sucu was offered another shot for the bronze medal by entering the repechage bouts. Unfortunately, he was defeated in the second round by Cuban wrestler and Olympic silver medalist Roberto Monzón, with a three-set technical score (3–1, 2–4, 1–1), and a classification point score of 1–3.

References

External links
 

1986 births
Living people
Olympic wrestlers of Turkey
Wrestlers at the 2008 Summer Olympics
People from Amasya
Turkish male sport wrestlers
Mediterranean Games bronze medalists for Turkey
Competitors at the 2009 Mediterranean Games
Mediterranean Games medalists in wrestling
20th-century Turkish people
21st-century Turkish people